Club El Porvenir is an Argentine football club, located in the Gerli district of Lanús Partido in Greater Buenos Aires. The team currently plays in Primera C, the regionalised fourth division of the Argentine football league system.

History 

The club was established on 12 September 1915 in Villa Porvenir, Avellaneda Partido, primarily as a Greco-Roman wrestling club. The football team debuted in official tournaments in 1918, playing its home games at the Club "Sígame Si Puede" ("Follow me if You can", in Spanish, current Sportivo Dock Sud).

In 1919 El Porvenir acquired the field where its first stadium would be built, winning the title that allowed the squad to promote to the "intermedia" (second) division, current Primera B, one year later, therefore promoting to the Primera División, the top division of Argentine league system. After its first season in Primera División, El Porvenir finished 5° in the 1921 championship.

Nevertheless, after the 15° fixture of the 1926 season, El Porvenir lost affiliation to the body, along with All Boys, Colegiales, Nueva Chicago, Temperley and Sportivo Barracas. One year later, El Porvenir won the Primera B title and returned to Primera. When football became professional in Argentina in 1931, El Porvenir remained in the official amateur association, making its best performance in 1934 when the squad finished 5° of 23 teams. However, El Porvenir would be relegated again when both associations, the amateur and dissident Liga Argentina de Football merged to form a unique body.

El Porvenir won another title, the Primera C championship, in 1954. The squad achieved another title in 1997–98 when winning the Primera B Metropolitana championship, therefore promoting to Primera B Nacional, the second division of Argentine football.

Stadiums 
During the decade of 1920, El Porvenir rented several fields until it inaugurated its own one, in Lanús, where the team played until 1939. The first international match played by El Porvenir was on 12 October 1920, against Uruguayan team Liga Nacional de Montevideo. In 1941 the club was disaffiliated by the Association due to it did not have a field, so El Porvenir began to build an stadium in Gerli, Lanús Partido. The stadium was opened on 4 April 1942, then enlarged in 1943 to host 10,000 spectators. This venue was used until 1968.

The current stadium was erected in lands donated by the Government of Argentina and was inaugurated on 24 April 1971. The first match played there was against defunct club Defensores de Almagro, which ended 1–1.

Players

Current squad

Notable former managers
  José Basualdo (2006)
  Norberto Raffo (1978–79)

Titles 
 División Intermedia (1): 1920
 Primera B (2): 1927, 1997–98
 Primera C (2): 1943, 1954
 Primera D (1): 2016

References

External links

 
 
 El Porve

Football clubs in Buenos Aires Province
Association football clubs established in 1915
1915 establishments in Argentina